Davy is the surname of:

 Edmund Davy (1785–1857), British chemist and academic
 Edward Davy (1806–1885), British physician and researcher
 Georges Davy (1883–1976), French sociologist
 Humphry Davy (1778–1829), British chemist 
 John Davy (disambiguation)
 Margot Davy - French model
 Richard Davy (c. 1465–1507), Renaissance composer, organist and choirmaster
 Steve Davy, British bass guitarist
 Thomas Davy (cyclist) (born 1968), French former cyclist
 Thomas Davy (politician) (1890–1933), Attorney-General and Minister for Education for Western Australia
 William Davy (divine) (1743–1826), English priest and writer
 William Davy (lawyer) (died 1780), English barrister
 William Gabriel Davy (1780-1856), British Army general who fought in the Peninsular War
 Davy (Surrey cricketer) (first name unknown), English cricketer who played in 1787–1788